The men's skeet shooting event at the 2015 Pan American Games was held between July 18 and 19 at Pan Am Shooting Centre in Innisfil.

The event consisted of three rounds: a qualifier, a semifinal and a medal round. In the qualifier, each shooter fired 5 sets of 25 shots in skeet shooting.

The top 6 shooters in the qualifying round moved on to the final round. There, they fired a round of 16 shoots. The top 2 qualified to dispute the golden medal, while the third and fourth place qualified to dispute the bronze medal.

The winners of all fifteen events, along with the runner up in the men's air rifle, skeet, trap and both women's rifle events qualified for the 2016 Summer Olympics in Rio de Janeiro, Brazil (granted the athlete has not yet earned a quota for their country).

Schedule

Records 
The existing world and Pan American Games records were as follows.

Results

Qualification round

Semifinal

Finals

Bronze-medal match

Gold-medal match

References

Shooting at the 2015 Pan American Games